Gunungia rimba is a species of snout moth in the genus Gunungia. It was described by Roesler and Küppers in 1979. It is found on Sumatra.

References

Moths described in 1979
Phycitinae